The following is a list of compositions by Paul Moravec.  For a description of selected works and further information on the composer, please see the Paul Moravec page.

Operas
 The Letter (2009)
 The Shining (2016)

Orchestral
 Concerto for Oboe & String Orchestra (2003) (c. 18')
 Northern Lights Electric (2000) (3.3.4.2-3.2.1.1-Timp.Perc.Pno.-Strings)
 Ancient Lights (1994) (2.2.2.2-2.2.1-perc.-strings) (c. 15')
 Aubade (1990) (String Orchestra) (c. 15')
 Concerto for Piano & Orchestra (1992) (Pno solo + 2.2.2.2-2.2.1-perc.-strings) (c. 30')
 Lyric Concerto for Violin & Orchestra (1994) (Vn solo + 2.2.2.2-2.2.1-perc.-strings) (c. 18')
 Montserrat: Concerto for Cello & Orchestra (2001) (Vc solo + 2.2.2.2-2.2.1-perc.-strings) (c. 18')
 Sempre Diritto! (Straight Ahead!) (1991) (2 Ob. 2 Hn. Strings) (c. 14')
 Spiritdance (1989) (3.3.3.2-2.2.1-perc.-strings) (c. 10')
 Streamline (1988) (2.2.2.2-2.2.1-perc.-strings) (c. 15')
 Adelphony (1997) (2.2.2.2-2.2.1-perc.-strings) (c. 5')

Chamber music

 The Time Gallery (2000) (c. 45') (Fl.Cl.Pno.Perc.Vn.Vc.)
 Cool Fire (2001) (c. 22') (Fl.2Vn.Va.Vc.Pno)
 Chamber Symphony (2003) (c. 20') (Fl.Cl.Hn.Vn.Vc.Pno.Perc.)
 Scherzo (2003) (c. 3') (Vn.Vc.Pno)
 Tempest Fantasy (2002) (c. 27') (Cl.Vn.Vc.Pno )
 Vince & Jan: Snapshot, 1945 (2002) (String Quartet)
 Music for Chamber Ensemble (1983) (Fl.Ob.Cl.Hn.Tr.Pno.Vn.Va.Vc.Db.) (c. 5')
 Octocelli (2000) (Cello Octet) (c. 10')
 Northern Lights Electric (1994) (Fl.Cl.Pno.2Vn.Va.Vc.DB) (c. 15')
 Inscape (1996) (Fl.Cl.Vn.Vc.Pno.Perc.) (c. 14')
 The Kingdom Within (1989) (Fl.Cl.Vn.Vc.Pno.Perc.) (c. 18')
 Circular Dreams (1991) (Fl.Cl.Vc.Pno.) (c. 18')
 Quatrocelli (2000) (Cello Quartet) (c. 10')
 String Quartet no. 1 (c. 18')
 String Quartet no. 2 (c. 12')
 String Quartet no. 3 (c. 16')
 Mood Swings (1998) (Vn.Vc.Pno) (c. 18')
 The Open Secret (1985) (Vn.Vc.Pno) (c. 15')
 B.A.S.S. Variations (1999) (c. 3') (Vn.Vc.Pno )

Brass

 Quintessence (1998) (Trumpet Quintet) (c. 12')
 Brass Quintet (1999) (c. 12')
 Hampshire Harmony (1993) (3 Tr.2Hn.2Tbn.Tuba) (c. 10')

Solo instrument and piano

 Sonata for Violin & Piano (1992) (c. 22')
 Protean Fantasy (1997) (Violin.Piano)
 Ariel Fantasy (2001) (c. 4') (Violin.Piano)
 Songs for Violin & Piano (1983)(c. 9')
 Timepiece (1984) (Violin.Piano) (c. 9')
 Lyric Dances (1981) (Flute.Piano) (c. 9')
 B.A.S.S. Variations (1999) (Flute.Piano) (c. 7')
 Autumn Song (2001) (Flute.Piano) (c. 5')
 Walk Away Slowly (1989) (Cello.Piano) (c. 8')
 Epithalamion (1993) (Trumpet.Piano) (c. 5')
 Zu-Zu's Petals (2001) (Marimba.Piano) (c. 5')

Solo piano

 Characteristics (1995) (c. 15')
 Music Remembers (1983) (c. 9)
 Impromptus (1999)(c. 7')
 Piano Triptych (1991)(c. 9')
 Felix In Hollywood (1996) (Film Score for Piano Solo) (8')
 Vai! ("GO!") (2002) (c. 4')

Solo voice and ensemble

 Wings (1983) (Sop.Fl.Cl.Vc.Pno.) (c. 13')
 Whispers (1986) (Tenor.1.1.1.-1.1.1.-strings) (c. 14')
 Sacred Songs (1982) (Baritone.Vn.Vc.Vc.) (c. 10')
 Dramatic Cantata: Spirit (2002) (Tenor.SATB Chorus.Orchestra)
 Fire.Ice.Air (1998) (Tenor.Baritone.Fl.Cl.Pno.Perc.St Quintet) (c. 25')

Solo voice and piano

 Everyone Sang (2003) (c. 3') (Baritone, piano)
 Vita Brevis (2001) (Tenor.Pno) (c. 10')
 Naked Simplicities (1997) (Tenor.Pno) (c. 15')
 Evensong (1991) (Tenor.Piano) (c. 14')
 Innocent Dreamers (1985) (Soprano.Piano) (12')
 Everyone Suddenly Burst Out Singing (1988) (Soprano.Piano) (c. 13')
 The American Sublime (1981) (Soprano.Piano) (c. 10')
 Riddle Me A Dream (2002) (Soprano.Piano) (3')
 The Rose and the Nightingale (2002) (Soprano.Piano) (3')
 A Crowd of Stars (2002) (Tenor.Piano) (3')
 Salute (2003) (High voice.piano)

Choral works

 Songs of Love and War (1997) (SATB.Baritone solo.strings.trumpet solo) (c. 20')
 Personals (1999) (SATB.Orchestra) (c. 15')
 A Spirit of Power (1996) (SATB.Orchestra) (c. 8')
 The Living (1997) (SATB.Organ) (c. 5')
 Four Transcendent Love Songs (1986) (SATB Chorus) (c. 11')
 Three Anthems (1983) (SATB Chorus) (c. 10')
 Pater Noster (1979) (SATB Chorus) (c. 4')
 Ave Verum Corpus (1979) (SATB Chorus) (5')
 Missa Miserere (1979) (SATB.Orchestra) (c. 20')
 i thank you, GOD (1983) (SSAA Chorus) (c. 4')
 Thanksgiving Song (2001) (SATB Chorus) (c. 4')
 Spirit (2002) (c. 18') (Tenor solo, SATB Chorus, Orchestra)
 No Words (2002) (TTBB Chorus, Piano)
 The Blizzard Voices (2008) (SATB, soprano solos, mezzo-soprano solo, tenor solo, baritone solo, bass solo, orchestra) (c. 70')

External links
 Catalog of Works from Adelphi University

Moravec